Soltanabad (also Romanized as Solţānābād) is a village in Dabuy-ye Jonubi Rural District, Dabudasht District, Amol County, Mazandaran Province, Iran. At the 2006 census, its population was 73, in 17 families.

References 

Populated places in Amol County